Washington State Community College (WSCC) is a public community college in Marietta, Ohio. It was established in 1971 as Washington Technical College and moved to its current location in 1991.

Notable alumni
Travis Flores - Children's book author, actor, and activist

References

External links
Official website

Community colleges in Ohio
Educational institutions established in 1971
Buildings and structures in Marietta, Ohio
Education in Washington County, Ohio
1971 establishments in Ohio